Edmond Proulx (May 21, 1875 – December 26, 1956) was an Ontario lawyer and political figure. He represented Prescott in the House of Commons of Canada as a Liberal member from 1904 to 1921 and in the Legislative Assembly of Ontario as an Independent Liberal from 1923 to 1929.

He was born in Saint-Hermas, Quebec in 1875, the son of Isidore Proulx and Philomène Lalande, and grew up in Plantagenet, Ontario. Proulx studied at the Collège Bourget in Rigaud, Quebec, the University of Ottawa, St. Michael's College, Toronto and Osgoode Hall. He articled in Ottawa and Toronto, was called to the bar and set up practice in L'Orignal in 1904. He was elected to the House of Commons in the general election later that year after the death of his father. In 1907, he married Renée Audette. Proulx ran unsuccessfully for the Prescott seat as an Independent Liberal in 1921 but was elected to the provincial assembly two years later, defeating Gustave Évanturel, the official Liberal candidate. In 1929, he was named a judge for Sudbury district.

Proulx retired from the bench in 1950. He died in Sudbury at the age of 81.

References

Further reading
 Histoire des Comtes Unis de Prescott et de Russell, L. Brault (1963)

External links

1875 births
1956 deaths
Franco-Ontarian people
Judges in Ontario
Liberal Party of Canada MPs
Members of the House of Commons of Canada from Ontario
Ontario Liberal Party MPPs
University of Toronto alumni